Wallarah Colliery was a coal mine located near Crangan Bay, Nords Wharf, New South Wales, Australia, and originally above ground utilities were  at Mine Camp, very near Catherine Hill Bay.    Originally coal was moved by above ground railway from Mine Camp area to the Catherine Hill Bay jetty, but  after the move to Crangan Bay, it was moved underground to surface  very near the jetty.

City of Lake Macquarie
Coal mines in New South Wales